Office supplies are consumables and equipment regularly used in offices by businesses and other organizations, by individuals engaged in written communications, recordkeeping or bookkeeping, janitorial and cleaning, and for storage of supplies or data. The range of items classified as office supplies varies, and typically includes small, expendable, daily use items, consumable products, small machines, higher cost equipment such as computers, as well as office furniture and art.

Typical products

Office supplies are typically divided by type of product and general use. Some of the many different office supply products include
Blank sheet paper: various sizes from small notes to letter and poster-size; various thicknesses from tissue paper to 120 pound; construction paper; photocopier and inkjet printer paper;
Preprinted forms: time cards, tax reporting forms (1099, W-2), "while you were out" pads, desk and wall calendars;
Label and adhesive paper: name tags, file folder labels, post-it notes, and address labels;
Media: ink and toner cartridges; memory cards and flash drives;
Communication equipment: desk telephones, cell phones, and VOIP adapters; WI-FI adapters, ethernet cable, network routers and switches;
Paper in roll or reel form: label tape, fax machine thermal paper, and adding machine tape;
Educational and entertainment items: books (business, time management and self-help), tax, business application and game software, desk accessories such as a Newton's cradle;
Mechanical fasteners: paper clips, binder clips, staples;
Chemical fasteners: duct tape, transparent tape, glue, mucilage;
Comestibles: usually on-the-go snacks such as coffee, cookies, candy, chips, pretzels, trail mixes, and other snacks;
Janitorial supplies: mops, buckets, wastebaskets, recycling bins, brooms, soap, air fresheners, disinfectants, detergents, paper towels, and toilet paper;
Merchant supplies: price tags; time clocks;  credit card processing machines and cash registers;
Small machines: hole punches, rubber stamps, numbering machines, staplers, pencil sharpeners, and laminators;
Containers: binders, envelopes, boxes, crates, shelves, folders, and desk organizers;
Writing pads and books: notebooks, composition books, legal pads, and steno pads;
Writing utensils and corrections: pens, pencils, paints, markers, correction fluid, correction tape, and erasers;
Higher-cost equipment: computers, printers, fax machines and photocopiers;
Office furniture: office chairs, cubicles, anti-static mats, rugs, filing cabinets, and armoire desks.
Office food eg convenience food, bottled water

Common supplies and office equipment items before the advent of suitably priced word processing machines and PCs in the 1970s and 1980s were: typewriters, slide rules, calculators, adding machines, carbon- and carbonless paper.

Many businesses in the office supply industry have recently expanded into related markets for businesses like copy centers, which facilitate the creation and printing of business collateral such as business cards and stationery, plus printing and binding of high quality, high volume business and engineering documents. Some businesses also provide services for shipping, including packaging and bulk mailing and even offer diverse services like screen printing, office coffee, office fruit and office grocery delivery. In addition, many retail chains sell related supplies beyond businesses and regularly market their stores as a center for school supplies with August and early September being a major retail period for back to school sales.

Market size

The office supply industry was estimated to be worth US$225 billion in 1999 and is still growing.

See also
List of office supply companies in the United States

References

Office equipment
Mass media technology

pt:Papelaria
tr:Kırtasiye